The untitled Seth Rogen project is an upcoming American comedy series starring, co-written, and executive produced by Seth Rogen. The series will be released on Apple TV+.

Production
On November 14, 2022, it was announced that Apple TV+ had acquired and given a straight-to-series order to an untitled showbiz comedy starring Seth Rogen. The series will be written by Rogen, Evan Goldberg, Peter Huyck, and Alex Gregory, and will be directed by Rogen and Goldberg.

The series will be executive produced by Seth Rogen, Evan Goldberg, and James Weaver for Point Grey Pictures, and Peter Huyck, Alex Gregory, Alex McAtee, and Josh Fagen. Production companies involved are Point Grey Pictures and Lionsgate Television.

References

English-language television shows
Apple TV+ original programming
Television series by Lionsgate Television
Upcoming comedy television series